Bruceia hubbardi is a moth of the family Erebidae. It was described by Harrison Gray Dyar Jr. in 1898. It is found in the US states of California and Nevada to Colorado and western Texas.

The wingspan is 22–25 mm. Adults are on wing from June to September.

References

Lithosiini
Moths described in 1898